Janusz Gajos (born 23 September 1939) is a Polish film, television and theatre actor as well as pedagogue and photographer. Professor of Theatre Arts and an Honorary Doctor of the National Film School in Łódź, he is considered one of the greatest Polish actors.

Life and career
He was born in Dąbrowa Górnicza. At the age of 11, he moved to Będzin where in 1957, he graduated from the High School No 3. In 1965 he graduated from the National Film School in Łódź as one of its best students despite having been rejected during entrance exams three times. He debuted while he was still in film school in children's film Panienka z okienka directed by Maria Kaniewska in 1964. Shortly afterwards he was cast in a role of Janek Kos in a widely popular TV World War II series Czterej pancerni i pies (Four Tank Men and a Dog). He starred in numerous other films and theatrical plays, notably in Krzysztof Kieślowski's Three Colors: White, Ryszard Bugajski's Interrogation, Andrzej Wajda's Man of Marble, Wojciech Marczewski's Escape from the 'Liberty' Cinema, Władysław Pasikowski's Pigs, Andrzej Wajda's The Revenge, Małgorzata Szumowska's Body and Wojciech Smarzowski's Clergy.

He performed in numerous theatres throughout his acting career including Stefan Jaracz Theatre in Łódź as well as the Komedia Theatre, Polish Theatre, Kwadrat, the Dramatic Theatre and the National Theatre in Warsaw. In 2003, he became an academic teacher at the National Film School in Łódź. He is also known for performing in popular Olga Lipińska's Cabaret.

In 2010, he officially endorsed the candidacy of Bronisław Komorowski in the 2010 Polish Presidential Elections as well as the 2015 Polish Presidential Elections.

In 2007, he received the Golden Medal for Merit to Culture – Gloria Artis. In 2011, he was awarded the Commander's Cross with Star of the Order of Polonia Restituta. He is a five-time winner of the Polish Film Awards including the Polish Film Award for Lifetime Achievement in 2016.

Filmography

 Solid Gold (2019), as CBŚ officer Nowicki
 Clergy (2018), as archbishop Mordowicz
 Kamerdyner (2018), as Bazyli Miotke
 Breaking the Limits (2017)
 Blindness (2016)
 Body (2015)
 The Closed Circuit
 Ekipa, as former Prime Minister Henryk Nowasz
 Pitbull (2005)
 Hamlet (2004/II) (TV), as Claudius 
 Zemsta (2002)  The Revenge, as Cześnik Raptusiewicz
 Chopin. Pragnienie miłości (2002)  Chopin: Desire for Love, as Duke Konstanty Pawlowicz
 Tam i z powrotem (2002)  There and Back, as Andrzej Hoffman
 Przedwiośnie (2001)  The Spring to Come, as Seweryn Baryka
 Weiser (2001), as Antiquarian 
 Żółty szalik (2000) (TV) 
 To ja, złodziej (2000)  It's Me, the Thief, as Roman Wyskocz
 Ostatnia misja (2000)  The Last Mission, as Police Inspector
 Egzekutor (1999), as Kowalik 
 Fuks (1999), as Policeman 
 Szczęśliwego Nowego Jorku (1997)  Happy New York, as Professor
 Czas zdrady (1997), as Messer Niccolo 
 Poznań 56 (1996), as Professor 
 Akwarium (1996) 
 Łagodna (1995)  A Gentle Woman, as He
 Śmierć jak kromka chleba (1994)  Death like a Slice of Bread, as Miodek
 Trzy kolory: Biały (1994)  Three Colors: White, as Mikolaj
 Straszny sen Dzidziusia Górkiewicza (1993)  The Terrible Dream of Babyface Gorkiewicz 
 Szwadron (1993)  Squadron 
 Coupable d'innocence (1992)  When Reason Sleeps 
 Psy (1992)  Pigs, as Gross
 Ucieczka z kina 'Wolność' (1991)  Escape From the 'Liberty' Cinema, as Cenzor
 Stan wewnętrzny (1990)  Inner State 
 Dekalog (1989)  The Decalogue (mini) TV Series, as Michal
 Piłkarski poker (1989)  Soccer Poker, as Referee Jan Laguna
 Dekalog, cztery (1988) (TV)  Honor Thy Father and Thy Mother, as Michal
 Big Bang (1986) (TV), as Janek
 Hamlet we wsi Głucha Dolna (1985) (TV) 
 Rok spokojnego słońca (1984)  The Year of the Quiet Sun, as Moonlighter
  (1984)  After Your Decrees, as Driver
 Alternatywy 4 (1983) TV Series, as Jan Winnicki 
 Gwiezdny pył (1982) 
 Limuzyna Daimler-Benz (1982)  The Consul, as Kuschmerek
 Nieciekawa historia (1982)  Uninteresting Story 
 Przesłuchanie (1982)  Interrogation, as Major Zawada "Kapielowy"
  (1981)  Z dalekiego kraju 
 Człowiek z żelaza (1981)  Man of Iron, as Committee vice-chairman
 Wahadełko (1981)  Shilly-Shally 
 Wojna światów - następne stulecie (1981)  The War of the World: Next Century  
 Dyrygent (1980)  Orchestra Conductor, as High Official
  (1980)  The Contract, as Boleslaw Bartoszuk
 Kung-Fu (1979), as Editor-in-Chief Maciek 
 Co mi zrobisz, jak mnie złapiesz? (1978)  What Will You Do When You Catch Me?, as Supermarket Manager
  (1978)  Millionaire, as Józef Mikula
 Mgła (1976)  The Fog 
 Wakacje z duchami (1970) TV Series, as Antoniusz
 Bicz boży (1967)  God's Whip, as Klen
 Stajnia na Salwatorze (1967)  Stall on Salvador 
 Bariera (1966)  Barrier (uncredited), as Tram Driver with Letter "E"
 Czterej pancerni i pies (1966) TV Series, as Pvt./Cpl./Sgt./Lt. Jan Kos 
 Szyfry (1966)  The Codes, as White monk
 Panienka z okienka (1964)

See also
Polish cinema
Gdynia Film Festival
Polish Film Awards

References

External links
 

People from Dąbrowa Górnicza
1939 births
Living people
Gajos
Polish cabaret performers
Polish male stage actors
Polish male film actors
Polish male television actors
20th-century Polish male actors
Recipients of the Gold Medal for Merit to Culture – Gloria Artis
Recipients of the Gold Cross of Merit (Poland)
Commanders with Star of the Order of Polonia Restituta